The 1941 Georgia Tech Yellow Jackets football team was an American football team that represented the Georgia Institute of Technology in the Southeastern Conference (SEC) during the 1941 college football season. In their 22nd season under head coach William Alexander, the Yellow Jackets compiled a 3–6 record (2–4 against SEC opponents) and were outscored by a total of 130 to 82. The team played its home games at Grant Field in Atlanta.

Schedule

References

Georgia Tech
Georgia Tech Yellow Jackets football seasons
Georgia Tech Yellow Jackets football